Responsibility for criminal law and criminal justice in the United States is shared between the states and the federal government.

Parties to a crime
The parties or participants in a crime include the principal and accessory.
A principal is a person directly involved in a crime. There are two types of principals:
 Principal in the first degree, the person that commits the crime.
 Principal in the second degree (accomplice), someone that aids, counsels, assists or encourages the first-degree principal.

Presence is required for a party to be considered 2nd degree, with constructive presence being sufficient. Both principals are punished equally and are equally liable for the crime the other commits.

An accessory is a person who helps commit the crime without being present. Accessories are generally punished less severely than the principal. There are two types of accessories:
 An accessory before the fact is a person who encourages or helps another commit a crime. Statutes group principals with these accessories and punish them together.
 An accessory after the fact is a person who learns of a crime and helps to conceal the crime or criminal by providing aid, comfort or shelter to help the principal avoid arrest or prosecution after the crime. An accessory after the fact must be aware of the criminal’s status and intend to hinder the arrest.

Sources of law
The federal government and all the states rely on the following.

Common law

Common law is law developed by judges through legal opinions, as opposed to statutes adopted through the legislative process or regulations issued by the executive branch. A common law crime is thus a crime which was originally defined by judges.

Common law crimes no longer exist at the federal level, because of the U.S. Supreme Court's decision in United States v. Hudson and Goodwin, 11 U.S. 32 (1812). The validity of common law crimes varies at the state level. More than a dozen states expressly retain a role for common law crimes: Alabama, Connecticut, The District of Columbia, Florida, Idaho, Maryland, Michigan, Mississippi, New Mexico, North Carolina, North Dakota, Rhode Island, South Carolina, Virginia, and Washington. All recognize the common law authority of judges to convict for conduct not criminalized by statute.

Statutes
All 50 states have their own penal codes. Therefore, for any particular crime somewhere, it would be necessary to look it up in that jurisdiction. However, statutes derive from the common law. For example, if a state's murder statute does not define "human being," that state's courts will rely on the common-law definition.

State vs. federal

The states, since they possess the police power, have the most general power to pass criminal laws in the United States. The federal government, since it can only exercise those powers granted to it by the Constitution, can only pass criminal laws which are related to the powers granted to Congress. For example, drug crimes, which comprise a large percentage of federal criminal cases, are subject to federal control because drugs are a commodity for which there is an interstate market, thus making controlled substances subject to regulation by Congress in the Controlled Substances Act which was passed under the authority of the Commerce Clause. Gonzales v. Raich affirmed Congress's power to regulate drug possession under the Controlled Substances Act under the powers granted to it by the Commerce Clause.

Model Penal Code

The Model Penal Code ("MPC") was created by the American Law Institute ("ALI") in 1962. In other areas of law, the ALI created Restatements of Law, usually referred to just as Restatements. For example, there is a Restatement of Contracts and a Restatement of Torts. The MPC is their equivalent for criminal law.

Many states have wholly or largely adopted the MPC. Others have implemented it in part, and still others have not adopted any portion of it. However, even in jurisdictions where it has not been adopted, the MPC is often cited as persuasive authority in the same way that Restatements are in other areas of law.

Theories of punishment

Principle of legality

An overarching concept in American criminal law is that people may not be punished for committing merely immoral or unethical acts. They can only be punished if that act has been announced beforehand as a crime.

Burden of proof

In the United States, the adversarial system is used. The prosecution must prove each element of the alleged crime beyond a reasonable doubt for conviction. Corpus delicti is also required, where the principle that a crime must be proved to have occurred before a person can be convicted of committing that crime. Confession is not enough to prove that a crime has occurred.

Elements
Crimes can generally be reduced to actus reus elements and mens rea elements. Actus reus elements are elements which describe conduct. Mens rea elements are elements which identify a particular mental state.

Actus reus

The phrase actus reus is typically translated as "guilty act."

Voluntary act

Ordinarily, a voluntary act refers to commission. However, as discussed below, some crimes do punish failure to act. A status is not a voluntary act. For example, no law will be constitutional that makes it a crime to be addicted to illegal drugs, as opposed to using them, as happened in Robinson v. California.

Omission
Failure to do something can occasionally be criminal. For example, not paying one's taxes is criminal. Typically, the criminality of failing to act will be codified.

Certain relationships create a duty to act at common law, such as spouse to spouse, parent to child, or employer to employee, for example.
A person may contract to act, such as a babysitter to render aid in the event of the child in their care hurting himself.

A person typically has a duty to act when he is responsible for putting the other in peril in the first place, such as through accidental injury.

Creation of reliance

A person may have a duty to act when he begins to act but then stops. This situation typically arises in the hypothetical where a person is drowning. One bystander among many starts swimming out to rescue him but simply changes his mind halfway and decides to turn around and go back to shore alone. The rationale for holding the bystander culpable is that the other bystanders did nothing because of his act. If the bystander had been the only person around, he would not be causing others not to assist, so he would not be culpable.

Social harm
Criminal law is distinguishable from tort law or contract law, for example, in that society as a whole is theoretically damaged. Obviously, there are particular victims, but society as a whole is the party responsible for the case against and, in the event of a conviction, punishment of the criminal. Social harm is that part of the crime that is sought to be avoided.

Mens rea

The phrase mens rea is typically translated as "guilty mind" and focuses on the mental state of the accused.

General intent is an awareness of factors constituting the crime, including attendant circumstances. The person must be aware that he is acting in a proscribed way and be aware of a high likelihood that attendant circumstances will occur. The requisite intent may be inferred from the doing of the act.

A specific intent crime requires the doing of an act coupled with specific intent or objective. Specific intent cannot be inferred from the doing of the act. The major specific intent crimes are:
conspiracy (intent to have crime completed), attempt (intent to complete a crime - whether specific or not, but falling short in completing the crime), solicitation (intent to have another person commit a crime), embezzlement (intent to defraud), first degree premeditated murder (premeditation), false pretenses (intent to defraud), forgery (intent to defraud), larceny & robbery (intent to permanently deprive other of interest in property taken), assault (intent to commit battery) and burglary (intent to commit felony in dwelling).

A strict liability crime, however, does not require that a mens rea be found. Common strict liability crimes include statutory rape and sale of alcohol to minors.

The MPC also addresses intent. One of its major innovations is the use of standardized mens rea terms (in MPC terms, culpability) to determine levels of mental states, just as homicide is considered more severe if done intentionally rather than accidentally. These terms are (in descending order) "purposely", "knowingly," "recklessly", "negligently", and "strict liability". Each material element of every crime has an associated culpability state that the prosecution must prove beyond a reasonable doubt.

Causation

Actual cause
Actual cause (also called "cause-in-fact") holds that the defendant cannot be criminally liable unless it can be shown that he was the cause-in-fact of the prohibited result. In order to find a defendant guilty, a court must be able to affirmatively answer the question, "But for the defendant's conduct, would the prohibited result have occurred when it did?"

There are some exceptions to the but-for test, however. For example, in a case where multiple wrongdoers "overdetermine" the harm that a victim would have experienced.

Proximate cause
The requirement of proximate cause (also called "legal" cause) restricts criminal liability to those cases where the harmful result which ensued was a foreseeable result of defendant's conduct. It is often phrased that the harmful result must be the "natural or probable" consequence of defendant's conduct.

Concurrence of actus reus and mens rea
Concurrence means the mens rea (mental state or guilty mind) coincides with the actus reus elements. X hates Y and knows that she plays soccer every July 4 at a certain park. July 4, 2010, X goes on a high hill overlooking the field that Y is playing on, and then intentionally dislodges a large boulder, and directs it towards Y intending to kill her. If it kills her, concurrence is complete.
Same situation, only the boulder rolls halfway down the hill, then gets lodged on a tree. X does everything he can to dislodge the boulder but cannot do so. He gives up. July 4, 2011, the boulder becomes dislodged in a storm (or otherwise becomes dislodged in any way other than X dislodging it with the intention of killing Y). The boulder kills Y, just as X intended one year ago. There is no concurrence, and X committed no crime.

Affirmative defenses
There are two categories of affirmative defenses: justification and excuse. Justifications differ from excuses in that a successful justification will show the defendant's conduct was not wrong, whereas a successful excuse does not show the defendant's conduct was wrong. A successful excuse shows that, while the defendant's conduct was regrettable, this particular defendant will not be subject to punishment.

Justification
Justification defenses are full defenses. Society essentially tells the actor that he did nothing wrong under the circumstances.

Self-defense or Defense of others
An accused will typically raise this defense when he is defending a crime of battery or homicide. Under common law, a person may use non-deadly force to defend himself from a non-deadly attack under certain circumstances. For one, he may not be the aggressor. Moreover, he must believe his force is necessary. Furthermore, that belief must be reasonable, it cannot be a defense if defendant unreasonably but honestly believed in the necessity of his actions.

In addition, the person must be facing imminent and unlawful force. Notably, the force the person uses need not be actually necessary. It need only appear so to a reasonable person.

Under common law, a person may use deadly force to defend himself from a deadly attack under the same circumstances as for a non-deadly attack except that a person may not use deadly force if non-deadly force would suffice. In some jurisdictions there is a duty to retreat before using deadly force. In counties where the duty to retreat exist, a non-aggressor has the duty to retreat from a threatening situation if he can do so with complete safety.

Other justifications
Other justifications include defense of others, defense of property, law enforcement, fear of imminent harm, and necessity.

Abandonment is used as a defense where a defendant voluntarily abandons the attempt before committing the act.

Impossibility defense where a crime's attempt fails because it is impossible to commit. There are two types of impossibility defenses:
 Factual impossibility where there is a factual error preventing commission of the crime.
 Legal impossibility where the defendant completed all of his intended acts, but his acts fail to fulfill all the required in elements for the crime.

Excuse
Excuse defenses are also full defenses. However, society is not saying the actor did nothing wrong, only that it will not punish him under the circumstances. Intoxication can serve as a defense, with the law distinguishing between how voluntary and involuntary intoxication can serve as defenses. Other excuses include duress and insanity. Infancy is a defense where the defendant is a minor and too young to form criminal intent.

Intoxication
Voluntary intoxication can be a defense for specific crimes (attempt, solicitation, conspiracy and so on), but not for general intent crimes (assault, battery, rape etc.).

Involuntary intoxication can be a defense if you don't know you're ingesting the intoxicant like taking a prescription drug that causes unexpected intoxication and so on. However, intoxication due to peer pressure or addiction is not enough defense.

Mistake
Mistake is another defense and can be a mistake of fact or a mistake of law. Mistake of Fact occurs when the defendant misunderstands a fact that negates an element of the crime. Mistake of law is the misunderstanding, incorrect application, or ignorance of the law's existence at the time. These mistakes must be honest, made in good faith, and reasonable to an ordinary person. Using mistake as a defense does not work in strict liability cases where the defendant's intent is irrelevant.

Duress
Duress is an excuse where a crime is committed because of immediate threat to life posed by another. The person using the defense must establish that a reasonable person in the same position would have also committed the crime and they had no alternative to committing the crime. Duress cannot be used as a defense in murder or if the party was responsible for getting into the situation that resulted in the threat.

Insanity defense
Insanity defense is the defense where a crime is excused due to an episodic or persistent psychiatric disease that effect legal responsibility at the time of the criminal act.
There are four tests for insanity:
 M'Naghten test shows that the defendant (1) did not know the nature and quality of the act or (2) the wrongfulness of the act.
 Irresistible-impulse test shows that the defendant lacks the capacity for self-control and free choice because mental disease or defect.
 Durham rule is a but-for test where the defendant is not if the unlawful act is the cause of a mental disease or defect, and the defendant would not have committed the act if it was not for the disease or defect.
 Model Penal Code as a result of mental disease or defect, didn't have substantial capacity to recognize the wrongfulness of the act or conform to legal conduct.
 ALI rule shows that a person is not guilty as a result of mental disease of defect, he lacks substantial capacity either to appreciate the criminality of his conduct or to conform his conduct to the requirements of the law.

Currently the US uses the ALI rule to determine if for the insanity defense.

Crimes
Crimes may be merged when they are deemed to result from a single criminal act. A merger occurs when a defendant commits a single act that simultaneously fulfills the definition of two separate offenses. The lesser of the two offenses will drop out, and the defendant will only be charged with the greater offense. For example, if someone commits robbery, the crime of larceny would be merged and the defendant would be charged with robbery, the greater of the two offenses.

Crimes against persons

Homicide
Only a human being can commit a homicide (as opposed to other legal persons, such as corporations). Homicide is the unlawful killing of another human being. The two types of homicide are murder and manslaughter.

A person who accidentally causes a fatal car accident by losing control of an automobile on black ice and kills a child is still considered to have committed "homicide," but this is not punishable as long as it is proven that it was a truly accidental car wreck. While homicide carries a criminal connotation to the layperson, from a legal standpoint it is merely the "unlawful killing of another human being" and may not be punishable.

Murder

A murder is a homicide with malice aforethought, an "endangering state of mind." There are four ways to satisfy the element of malice. One is an intent to kill and is the only form of express malice. The remaining ways are implied malice. One is an intent to inflict great bodily harm. A third is a reckless disregard for the value of human life, sometimes called depraved heart. The last only applies when someone dies during the commission or attempted commission of a felony. It is often called the felony murder rule and only requires the person to intend to commit the underlying felony.

Degrees of murder did not exist under common law. Most states have statutorily created at least two degrees of murder. Usually, a person only commits first-degree murder when he has express malice. If he has any other type of malice, he usually commits second-degree murder. American law reformed old-world, common-law practices during the ages of Henry VIII where even petty thieves were executed. American law generally categorizes the level of punishment and created lesser sentences, as opposed to the common law "one size fits all," hence the first-, second-, third- and fourth-degree murder with different level of punishment. (See voluntary manslaughter)

First degree murder is proven when malice aforethought accompanies "willful, deliberate and premeditation" of the criminal homicide. Since it is the harshest degree of murder in terms of sentencing and societal punishment, a first-degree murder must be especially premediated. Premeditation is the time and capacity to appreciate the enormity of the evil imposed. It involves weighing the pros and cons of one's own actions, and allowing one to think calmly, rationally and thoughtfully. A planned event, with a design to maliciously murder another human being, such as a gang member planning a contract murder or a serial killer outlining the steps to kidnapping his next victim, are committing premeditated acts when, if caught and charged, usually are proven to have committed murder in the first degree.

Second degree murder, however, initiated by any other crime which satisfies the general malice aforethought whereas "malice is merely implied." Second degree murder includes intention to kill the victim, but no plans to act. This include depraved heart, where an act of high-risk conduct or acting in extreme recklessness is knowingly done to put the victim in danger.

The Model Penal Code does not categorize murder by degrees.

Manslaughter
Voluntary manslaughter is the lesser charge of homicide, lesser than murder, for a reason that has come down by American law taken from the felony murder rule doctrine of the common law. American society has come to understand how a loss of self-control, brought about through emotional states, can push a person toward murder when it is not rationally intended. Since Henry the Eighth, common law practices were harsh whereas petty thieves were executed, as well as criminals whose motives were understood as emotionally challenging to maintain self-control. Voluntary manslaughter, although punishable, is an intentional, malicious form of homicide that involves certain elements to justify this lesser charge.

The "Heat of Passion" and "Cooling off Period" are subjective justifications that are argued in court, by attorneys, based on circumstantial evidence and establishment of motives where proof of a crime may not be fully ascertained. The ideas that a person, whom upon walking into his bedroom, observes his wife having sex with another male (his lifelong rival), reacts harshly, grabs a nearby gun, and within a matter of minutes, kills both of them, is less punishable than other forms of deliberate, premeditated and willful acts of calculated murder. A person is still "hot," the heat of passion is so great that reason is dismissed, and primal aggression takes over, but it was never the natural intention of the person ever—with no evidence of ever having marital problems or the like. Because he or she walked in on his partner's infidelity and kills both of them within minutes, he or she has no chance to cool off. However, the heat of passion and cooling are subjective factors.

According to the law, a murder charge can become a voluntary manslaughter charge if there is proof of "legally adequate provocation," the objective test. This truly objective standard combines heat of passion and cooling off to determine them from the facts of a case. The question is, "Does the defendant have legally adequate provocation to have lost control?" In situations of infidelity described above, he does, according to America's general interpretation. (Facts of a particular case may override some of that matter, however). Insulting words alone cannot justify legally adequate provocation.

Think about reasonably adequate provocation in terms of a stressful trigger to a loss of self-control. The law says insulting words, or words alone, cannot justify a trigger of criminal homicide. Your lover cannot call you a name, thereby making you justified in killing them. The legally adequate provocation must go beyond insulting words to events, situations and circumstances that surprise the defendant and trigger them to lose any sort of reasonableness without time to think through the consequences nor weigh the pros and cons. In this way, a court may establish a defendant, originally charged with second degree murder, to have been legally adequately provoked to commit the unlawful act of killing of another human being making his crime less punishable, but still punishable.

Voluntary manslaughter results in a lesser charge than murder, but more than involuntary manslaughter.

Involuntary manslaughter is unintentional killing of a person, the law requires proof beyond a reasonable doubt of some form of malfeasance or misfeasance. Malfeasance is considered to be any dangerous, unlawful act (felony), misfeasance includes any act, even lawful, that is criminally negligent (misdemeanor).

Assault & Battery
Assault is the act of intentional putting another person endangered of an imminent threat. This can be in the form of attempted battery or verbal threats.
An assault charge is aggravated when there is the intention to murder or rape a person.
Mayhem or malicious assault is the intentional dismemberment or disfiguring of a person.
Stalking is the repeated following, threaten or harassing in ways leading to fear of harm.

Battery is the unconsented bodily contact with another or the intentional use of force or violence against another.
Battery is aggravated when using a weapon or dangerous object, when it results in disfigurement or serious physical injury.

Both assault and battery classified as aggravated when directed towards a person with special status such as a law enforcement officer or elderly person.

Kidnapping & False Imprisonment
False imprisonment is the prevention of a person from leaving an area by interferes with liberty by force without authority.

Kidnapping is the taking away and holding a person against their will where a person is confinement of a person unlawfully, asportation or moved of another person by force, threat, or deception.
Parental kidnapping is the kidnapping of a child, violating a court order.

Sexual Crimes

Rape

Rape is defined as penetration, no matter how slight, of the vagina or anus with any body part or object, or oral penetration by a sex organ of another person, without the consent of the victim.

Rape is generally a second-degree felony, except when there is bodily injury or when the person is not the companion of rapist.

American rape law has transitioned common law practices which grew out of a male centric legal interpretation to the feministic view it has today. A woman once had to prove absolute resistance against her aggressor, and rape reformation laws in America did away with the Hale Warning, corroborating evidence, and the early outcry doctrine and instead focused rape law reform onto the aggressive, coercive nature of the "rapist." Marital rape law once required "forcible, unlawful and carnal knowledge," and common law once believed husbands cannot rape their wives, so these incidents, if reported at all, were never charged. Women in America have reported more rape with these times; however, rape is the most under-reported crime; 63% of sexual assaults are not reported to police. 

Rape shield laws were adopted in the 1970s and 1980s, which do not permit any evidence relating to the past sexual behavior of the victim and protects the victims' character and identity. A federal rape shield law was adopted in 1994 under the Violence Against Women Act.

Rape can also be non-forcible where the victim in incapable of consenting in cases where the victim has a mental or emotional disability, or in statuary cases where the victim is underage, despite their consent. Non-forcible rape are strict liability crimes, where the act alone is sufficient for proof.

Crimes Against Property

Arson
Arson is the malicious or reckless burning of property. The charge is aggravated when burning a dwelling, where the victim resides. Second degree arson is the burning of property that is uninhabited. Third degree arson is the burning of personal property.

Burglary
Burglary is the unlawful entry of a property for the purpose of committing a felony inside.

Theft
Theft in the United States is the take property at the detriment of another.
The property can be constructively possessed, where property entrusted to a person and is under their control, but still retained by owner.

Definitions of theft is codified in Title 18 of the United States Code Chapter 31.

Larceny is the trespassory taking without consent and asportation of personal property of another intent to permanently deprive the person of possession of that property.

The term property of another means a person cannot steal from himself, joint accounts, spouses, or partnerships.

Larceny by trick is a crime which involves the obtainment of another's property through fraud.

Robbery at common law was the trespassory taking of the property of another with the intent to permanently deprive the person of that property by means of force or fear.

Robbery charges result in substantial sentences which may be up to ten years with parole. Robbery with a deadly weapon increases this sentence and depends on the present ability of the defendant during the commission of the res gestae, or "the thing that happened". The precise language of this charge must be carefully reasoned to a jury panel by a trial court judge. In order for a taking to be "felonious", proof must exist beyond the defendant's animus firandi, or "evil in the heart". In other words, robbery is a charge reliant on the notion of possession of property of another and the force or fear used to accomplish the transfer of possession. According to the legal standard, a sleeping man cannot be aware that his property is being stolen. Therefore, a thief cannot be charged with robbery based on the force or fear prior to the incident requirement.

The transfer of property cannot be a voluntary transaction. In looking at property holding, three major distinctions are made in cases where a charge of robbery is not inexplicably obvious. "Mere custody," entitlement, and possession are the three levels of property holding and are specifically important to the precise language of the legal interpretation of what constitutes a robbery. If a person has mere custody of an object belonging to another, he or she is borrowing the object in question. If a citizen loans his vehicle to an associate to go to the grocery store, the associate must return the vehicle. If one purchases a new CD, the purchaser is entitled to the property because it becomes your own under your ownership.

Possession, however, is acquiring an object of another without being entitled to it or allowed to possess it. A person charged with a robbery may have reasonably believed he or she owned the iPod, although they may have been incorrect. Possession, in terms of the legal interpretation of robbery, is 9/10 of the law. Possession, to charge robbery, must be a transfer of property acquired through force or fear. That is, a defendant must create fear through force in order to achieve the possession of the object or property in question, otherwise they may have committed another crime. A person who threatens another with future violence cannot be charged with robbery, because they did not use "force or fear", and insulting words alone cannot allow somebody to be entitled to self-defense. Therefore, a person who holds up victim with a deadly weapon, with or without present ability (bullets in the weapon that is charged and fails to meet its target-assault) and takes possession of a book the victim is holding, is committing robbery according to the law.

The force or fear established by the defendant must precede the transfer of possession of the object in question. This can be said, also, as the transfer of possession must be acquired through the use of force or fear as the tool of attaining such goods in order to achieve all aspects of the legal doctrine imposed, "the felonious taking."

Embezzlement is where a person entrusted with possession of the property, converted the property, deprive without permission or substantially interferes with owners' rights, by one who acquired lawful possession with the intent to defraud. Embezzlement differs from larceny where the taking of property must not be trespassory.

False pretenses are crimes where a false representation of material or past fact is made with the knowledge that the fact is false, with the intent to defraud to pass property title to the actor. The false representation can be made orally, in writing, or implied by action.

The information that is falsely represented must be material or relate to present or past facts, they cannot be opinions or predictions. It must be proven that the defendant knew the statements made were false or reckless.

Crimes Against the State

Public morality & order

Administration

Sovereignty and Security

Inchoate crimes
An inchoate crime is the crime of preparing for or seeking to commit another crime. Inchoate crimes include attempt, solicitation and conspiracy. Except for conspiracy, inchoate offenses merge into the completed offense and attempt.

Attempt
Attempt is the effort to commit a crime that goes beyond preparation and proceeds enough that a crime can be charged. To prove attempt, the person must:
 intend to commit crime, must act further with intent, crime is not completed.
 must take a specific action that is criminal. This include asking an individual to join in on the crime, purchasing a weapon, or planning a crime and executing the steps to complete the plan.
Usually, thoughts alone or mere preparation is insufficient.

Several tests are used to prove intent including:
 Res ipsa loquitur looks at crime individually and finds an act indicating the defendant has no other purpose than to commit the specific crime.
 Proximity Test where the acts that are taken and the remaining acts are examined. The completed acts must be a dangerous proximity to success.
 Model Penal Substantial Step where steps taken towards the commission of a crime. Conduct must only corroborate.

Solicitation
Solicitation is encouraged, request, entice, or command another to commit a crime. The defendant must intend to convince another to commit the crime and the crime is completed when defendant communicate the request to another party. The other party does not need to agree with defendant's request.

Conspiracy
Conspiracy is the agreement between two or more persons and intend to commit an unlawful act.
Wharton's Rule prevents the prosecution of two people for conspiracy when the offense in question can only be committed by at least two persons in crimes such as prostitution and gambling. In cases where Wharton's Rule applies, then more than two people are require for conspiracy.

See also 
 United States Federal Sentencing Guidelines

References

Further reading